This is a list of Greek singers and groups with articles on Wikipedia. Note that it may never be complete.

A
Adiexodo
Nancy Alexiadi
Haris Alexiou
Dol Ammad
Costas Andreou
Antique
Thomai Apergi
Annet Artani
Eleftheria Arvanitaki
Astarte

B
Ble

C
C:Real
Chryspa
Costadinos Contostavlos
Tula Contostavlos

D
George Dalaras
Christos Dantis
Deus Ex Machina
Angela Dimitriou
Stratos Dionysiou
Natalia Doussopoulos

E
Eleftheria Eleftheriou
Epikouri
Evridiki

F
FF.C
Firewind
Eleni Foureira
Fragile Vastness
Mario Frangoulis
Thodoris Ferris

G
Diamanda Galas
Nikos Ganos
Keti Garbi
Genia Tou Chaous
Glykeria
Nikos Gounaris

H
Michalis Hatzigiannis
Hi-5

I
Imiskoumbria
In Trance 95

K
Kalomira
Katrin the Thrill
Giorgos Karadimos
Nikos Karvelas
Kelly Kelekidou
Elli Kokkinou
Kore. Ydro.
Stamatis Kraounakis
Diafana Krina

L
Labis Livieratos
Locomondo

M
Nana Mouskouri 
Lavrentis Mahairitsas
Dionysis Makris
Popi Maliotaki
Manto
Marina and the Diamonds
Marinella
Marsheaux
Kostas Martakis
Matisse
Giorgos Mazonakis
Memorain
Eirini Merkouri
Nikos Mihas
Mikro
Takis Mousafiris
Mode Plagal
Mazoo & The Zoo

N
Necromantia
Nightfall
Nino

O
ONAR
One
Onirama
On Thorns I Lay

P
Lefteris Pantazis
Giorgos Papadopoulos
Elena Paparizou
Giannis Parios
Giorgos Perris
Thanos Petrelis
Phase
Marianda Pieridi
Filippos Pliatsikas
Giannis Ploutarxos
Pyx Lax

R
Raining Pleasure
Anna Rezan 
Antonis Remos
Rotting Christ
Demis Roussos

S
Sabrina
Sarah P.
Sarbel
Secret Band
Septic Flesh
Notis Sfakianakis
Sirusho
Socrates Drank the Conium
Xylina Spathia
Stereo Mike
Stereo Nova

T
Tamta
Paschalis Terzis
Thalassa
The Earthbound
The Last Drive
Natasa Theodoridou
Efi Thodi
Thou Art Lord
Trypes
Typaldos D. children's choir
Theta (musician)
Vangelis Trigas

V
Vangelis
Despina Vandi
Nikos Vertis
Anna Vissi

W
Wastefall

Y
Savina Yannatou
Ypogeia Revmata

Z
Peggy Zina
Apostolia Zoi

See also

 List of Greeks
 Lists of musicians

References

 
Musicians
Greece